Arendals Tidende (The Arendal Times) is a local newspaper published in Arendal two days a week, on Mondays and Fridays. On Mondays Arendals Tidende is issued as an ordinary newspaper, and on Fridays it is issued in glossy magazine format.

The newspaper covers the municipality of Arendal, and it was launched in the fall of 2005 as a sample edition. Since January 1, 2006 it has been published as a subscription newspaper. Arendals Tidende celebrated its tenth year of publication in the fall of 2015.

Arendals Tidende is a politically independent publication that follows the Ethical Code of Practice for the Norwegian Press. The paper was started by Nils Petter Vigerstøl as chief editor, who was succeeded by Morten Kraft. The paper's current chief editor is Grete Aronsen Husebø, and the culture editor is Linda Christensen.

In 2006, Arendals Tidende was the fastest-growing newspaper in the Agder district. In April 2007, Arendals Tidende won the National Association of Local Newspapers concept award for its summer show Pearls of Arendal.

The board of Arendals Tidende filed for bankruptcy on April 25, 2012. After the bankruptcy, the paper entered a major partnership with Tvende Media and moved into new premises on Havnegaten. Before the bankruptcy, the paper was produced at the Arendal train station. The paper functioned at that time as an agent for Norwegian State Railways and was responsible for employing a former railway employee. As a result, the station was still staffed on weekdays and the waiting room was open on weekends.

The paper launched its online edition in 2014.

Circulation
According to the Norwegian Audit Bureau of Circulations and the National Association of Local Newspapers, Arendals Tidende has had the following annual circulation:
2006: 2,067
2007: 2,136
2008: 2,377
2009: 2,381
2010: 2,010
2011: 2,075
2012: 1,817
2013: 1,719
2014: 1,655
2015: 1,477
2016: 998

References

External links
 Arendals Tidende homepage

Newspapers published in Norway
Norwegian-language newspapers
Mass media in Arendal
Publications established in 2005